Naval Computer and Telecommunications Command (COMNAVCOMTELCOM) was located at the intersection of Massachusetts Avenue and Nebraska Avenue within Nebraska Avenue Complex in Washington, D.C.

See also

Naval Network Warfare Command
Director, Communications Security Material System
Naval Communications Security Material System

References

External links
 http://www.netwarcom.navy.mil/

Shore commands of the United States Navy
Military units and formations established in 1990
Military units and formations disestablished in 2001
Military in Washington, D.C.